The 2019 Consumers Energy 400 is a Monster Energy NASCAR Cup Series race held on August 11, 2019 at Michigan International Speedway in Brooklyn, Michigan. Contested over 200 laps on the  D-shaped oval, it is the 23rd race of the 2019 Monster Energy NASCAR Cup Series season.

Report

Background

The track is used primarily for NASCAR events. It is sometimes known as a "sister track" to Texas World Speedway, and was used as the basis of Auto Club Speedway. The track is owned by International Speedway Corporation (ISC). Michigan International Speedway is recognized as one of motorsports' premier facilities because of its wide racing surface and high banking (by open-wheel standards; the 18-degree banking is modest by stock car standards).

Entry list
 (i) denotes driver who are ineligible for series driver points.
 (R) denotes rookie driver.

First practice

Qualifying

Qualifying results

Reed Sorenson practiced and qualified the No. 77 for Garrett Smithley, who was in Mid-Ohio for the Xfinity Series race.
Austin Dillon and Daniel Hemric failed post-qualifying inspection and their times were disallowed. Each crew chief was fined $25,000 and 10 points were deducted from the driver and owner standings for each team.

Practice (post-qualifying)

Second practice

Final practice

Race

Stage results

Stage One
Laps: 60

Stage Two
Laps: 60

Final stage results

Stage Three
Laps: 80

Race statistics
 Lead changes: 19 among 8 different drivers
 Cautions/Laps: 6 for 24
 Red flags: 0
 Time of race: 2 hours, 40 minutes and 59 seconds
 Average speed:

Media

Television
NBC Sports covered the race on the television side. Rick Allen, Jeff Burton, Steve Letarte and two-time Michigan winner, Dale Earnhardt Jr. had the call in the booth for the race. Parker Kligerman, Marty Snider and Kelli Stavast reported from pit lane during the race.

Radio
Motor Racing Network had the radio call for the race, which was simulcast on Sirius XM NASCAR Radio. Alex Hayden, Jeff Striegle and four time Michigan winner Rusty Wallace had the call from the booth. Dave Moody called the action when the field raced thru turns 1 & 2. Kyle Rickey had the call for the race when the field raced thru turns 3 & 4. Covering the action in the pits was Woody Cain, Kim Coon, and Pete Pistone.

Standings after the race

Drivers' Championship standings

Manufacturers' Championship standings

Note: Only the first 16 positions are included for the driver standings.
. – Driver has clinched a position in the Monster Energy NASCAR Cup Series playoffs.

References

Consumers Energy 400
Consumers Energy 400
Consumers Energy 400
NASCAR races at Michigan International Speedway